This is a list of Portuguese football transfers for the summer of 2017. The summer transfer window will open 1 July and close at midnight on 22 September. Players may be bought before the transfer windows opens, but may only join their new club on 1 July. Only moves involving Primeira Liga clubs are listed. Additionally, players without a club may join a club at any time.

Transfers

References

Lists of Portuguese football transfers
Football transfers summer 2017
2017–18 in Portuguese football